The Canton of Saint-Benoît-du-Sault is a French former administrative subdivision, situated in the Indre département and the Centre région. It had 5,139 inhabitants (2012). It was disbanded following the French canton reorganisation which came into effect in March 2015. It consisted of 14 communes, which joined the canton of Saint-Gaultier in 2015.

Geography 
The Canton of Saint-Benoît-du-Sault is in the Arrondissement of Le Blanc. Its altitude varies from 112 m (Dunet) to 344 m (Mouhet), with a median altitude of 218 meters above sea level.

The canton comprised the following communes:

Beaulieu
Bonneuil
Chaillac
La Châtre-Langlin
Chazelet
Dunet
Mouhet
Parnac
Roussines
Sacierges-Saint-Martin
Saint-Benoît-du-Sault
Saint-Civran
Saint-Gilles
Vigoux

Demography

Administration 
The last conseiller général was Gérard Mayaud, of the UDF.

See also
 Arrondissements of the Indre department
 Cantons of the Indre department
 Communes of the Indre department

References

Saint-Benoit-du-Sault
2015 disestablishments in France
States and territories disestablished in 2015